Cerithiopsis elsa is a species of sea snail, a gastropod in the family Cerithiopsidae. It was described by Dall in 1927.

Description 

Habitat 

References

elsa
Gastropods described in 1927